Diocese of Pankshin may refer to:

Anglican Diocese of Pankshin
Roman Catholic Diocese of Pankshin